Fred Eychaner (born c. 1945) is an American businessman and philanthropist.

Eychaner is the chairman of Newsweb Corporation.  He was included in Chicago magazine's 2014 list of the 100 most powerful Chicagoans. In 2005, the Chicago Tribune estimated his wealth at $500 million. In 2015, he was inducted into the Chicago LGBT Hall of Fame.

Eychaner is a major donor to Democratic campaigns, gay rights advocacy groups, and arts organizations.

Early life and education
Eychaner was born to a middle-class Methodist family in DeKalb, Illinois, the son of Mildred (Lovett) and Howard Franklin Eychaner. His father owned a moving and storage business. He has three siblings, including Iowa businessman Rich Eychaner. He attended the Medill School of Journalism.

Business interests
In the late 1970s, Eychaner founded Metrowest Corporation, which would eventually become Newsweb, which prints a wide variety of newspapers. It was in 1982 that, through Metrowest, he launched Chicago television station WPWR-TV Channel 50 in Chicago. It was also in 1982 that, alongside Chicago White Sox owners Jerry Reinsdorf and Eddie Einhorn, he was involved in the launching of the subscription sports television service Sportsvision. The service was sold to Cablevision Systems Corporation in 1984, who converted it into a basic cable service. In 2002, WPWR was sold to Fox Television Stations for a reported $425 million. Then, in 2005, through Newsweb, he launched Chicago radio station WCPT (820 AM), branded as Chicago's Progressive Talk.

Philanthropy
He is President of the charitable organization Alphawood Foundation which granted the School of Oriental and African Studies, University of London £20m in 2013. Eychaner has given the Clinton Foundation more than $25 million. He is also credited with getting the long-delayed FDR Four Freedoms Park on Roosevelt Island in New York finally constructed.

In November 2013, Alphawood announced a $2 million matching grant to help jumpstart construction of the Bloomingdale Trail in Chicago.

Eychaner commissioned architect Tadao Ando to design his house in Chicago, which was completed in 1997, and the Wrightwood 659 gallery next door, which officially opened in 2018.

Political activities
He has been a top Democratic donor for several cycles and in the 2012 election cycle was the top donor to Democratic Super PACs, giving more than $14 million.

Boards
He serves on the board of the Joffrey Ballet, and of the Art Institute of Chicago. He is also a trustee of the Asian Art Museum in San Francisco.

In September 2010, President Barack Obama appointed Eychaner a general trustee to the board of trustees of the John F. Kennedy Center for the Performing Arts.

References

Living people
1945 births
American philanthropists
American LGBT businesspeople
LGBT people from Illinois
Inductees of the Chicago LGBT Hall of Fame